Kauditan is a district in North Minahasa Regency, North Sulawesi Province, Indonesia. The list of villages in Kauditan district are:
Kaasar
Kaima
Karegesan
Kauditan Dua
Kauditan Satu
Kawiley
Lembean
Paslaten
Treman
Tumaluntung
Watudambo

Districts of North Sulawesi